Ernst Ludwig Taschenberg (10 January 1818 Naumburg – 19 January 1898 Halle) was a German entomologist.

Life
After 1836 Taschenberg studied mathematics and natural sciences in Leipzig and Berlin. He went, then,  as an auxiliary teacher to the Franckesche Stiftungen and dedicated himself to arranging the important beetle collection of professor Germar and with the curation and study of the insect collection of the zoological museum particularly the entomology collections.

He worked as a teacher in Seesen for two years and then in five Zahna for five years but in 1856 he became “Inspektor“ at the zoological museum in Halle and in 1871 he was appointed extraordinary professor. His insect studies were mainly applied to agriculture, horticulture and silviculture and he is an important figure in the history of Economic entomology. He also described new insect species in several orders. His son Ernst Otto Wilhelm Taschenberg was also an entomologist specialising in Hymenoptera.

Works
Was da kriecht und fliegt, Bilder aus dem Insektenleben. (Berlin 1861); 
Naturgeschichte der wirbellosen Tiere, die in Deutschland den Feld-, Wiesen- und Weidekulturpflanzen schädlich werden. (Leipzig 1865); 
Die Hymenopteren Deutschlands (Leipzig 1866); 
 Entomologie für Gärtner und Gartenfreunde. (Leipzig 1871); 
Schutz der Obstbäume und deren Früchte gegen feindliche Tiere. (2. Aufl., Stuttgart 1879); 
Forstwirtschaftliche Insektenkunde. (Leipzig 1873); 
Das Ungeziefer der landwirtschaftlichen Kulturgewächse. ( Leipzig 1873); 
Praktische Insektenkunde. 5 Bde. (Bremen 1879-80); 
Die Insekten nach ihrem Schaden und Nutzen. (Leipzig 1882); Digital edition by the University and State Library Düsseldorf
Die Insekten, Tausendfüker und Spinnen'. (Leipzig und Wien 1892).
 
He also worked on the insects for Alfred Brehm's Tierleben'' (2. Aufl. 1877) and on zoological and entomological posters for school use.

Collection
Taschenberg's faunistic collection of Hymenoptera and Lepidoptera from Sachsen-Anhalt is in the Martin Luther University of Halle-Wittenberg.

External links
Literature at the German National Library 
History of entomology at Halle in German

1818 births
1898 deaths
German entomologists
Hymenopterists
People from the Province of Saxony
People from Naumburg (Saale)
Leipzig University alumni
Humboldt University of Berlin alumni
Academic staff of the Martin Luther University of Halle-Wittenberg